Events from the year 1185 in Ireland.

Incumbent
Lord: John

Events
April–December – John's first expedition to Ireland: Prince John of England visits Ireland to consolidate Anglo-Norman overlordship. He is accompanied by Gerald of Wales.
Cork charter was granted by Prince John.
Occupation of lands in County Limerick begun by Theobald Walter, William de Burgh and Philip of Worcester.
William de Burgh arrives in Ireland.

Births

Deaths

References